The Last Days of Colonel Savath is a 1995 Cambodian short film drama directed by Norodom Sihanouk.

Cast
Kong Sophy   
Mom Soth
Chorn Torn

External links
 

1995 films
Cambodian short films
Khmer-language films
1995 drama films
1995 short films
Cambodian drama films